Francis Afriyie (born January 18, 1995) is a Ghanaian footballer who plays as a forward for Township Rollers.

Career
Afriyie played back home with Bechem United. During winter-break of 2016–17, he, along his teammate Joseph Bempah joined Serbian side FK Vojvodina. A year later, without making any appearance in the Serbian SuperLiga, again along his compatriot Bempah, both left Europe and moved to Mexican side Murciélagos F.C. After Murcielagos' relegation due to financial issues, Francis Afriyie joined Gor Mahia F.C.

In January 2020, Afriyie joined Botswana Premier League club Township Rollers.

References

External links
 
 Francis Afriyie at GhanaSoccer
 Francis Afriyie at Ghanaweb

1995 births
Living people
Ghanaian footballers
Ghanaian expatriate footballers
Association football forwards
Bechem United FC players
FK Vojvodina players
Murciélagos FC footballers
Gor Mahia F.C. players
Township Rollers F.C. players
Liga MX players
Ghana Premier League players
Expatriate footballers in Mexico
Expatriate footballers in Serbia
Expatriate footballers in Kenya
Expatriate footballers in Botswana
Ghanaian expatriate sportspeople in Mexico
Ghanaian expatriate sportspeople in Serbia